The 1921–22 Cincinnati Bearcats men's basketball team represented the University of Cincinnati during the 1921–22 NCAA men's basketball season. The head coach was Boyd Chambers, coaching his fourth season with the Bearcats. The team finished with an overall record of 15–8.

Schedule

|-

References

Cincinnati Bearcats men's basketball seasons
Cincinnati Bearcats men's basketball team
Cincinnati Bearcats men's basketball team
Cincinnati Bearcats men's basketball team